Kiến An is an urban district (quận) of Hai Phong, the third largest city of Vietnam.

Notable people
 

 Nguyễn Đình Tấn, Vietnamese classical composer

References

Districts of Haiphong